Harry Lyon may refer to:

 Harry Lyon (musician), New Zealand musician
 Harry Lyon (aviator), United States pioneer aviator
 Harry Lyon (footballer) (died 1984), English football player

See also
Harry Lyons (disambiguation)
Henry Lyon (disambiguation)